Jeremiah McVeagh (1870/73 – 17 April 1932) was an Irish nationalist politician and Member of Parliament (MP) in the House of Commons of the United Kingdom of Great Britain and Ireland.

He was the son of Thomas McVeagh, shipowner, and was educated at St Malachy's College, Belfast, and at the Royal University of Ireland.

A journalist and barrister by profession, in the 1890s, McVeagh was based in London, where he was active in the Irish National League of Great Britain.

He was first elected as the Irish Parliamentary Party MP for the South Down constituency at the 19 February 1902 by-election, and was again re-elected at the 1906, January 1910, December 1910 and 1918 general elections, and served until 1922 as member of the Nationalist Party.

He was an unsuccessful candidate for the British Labour Party in Sunderland at the 1924 United Kingdom general election,. He was also unsuccessful in the 1925 Irish Seanad election and the June 1927 Irish general election, when he ran for the National League Party in Monaghan.

In 1913 he presented the Jeremiah MacVeagh Cup to the Down County GAA Board. The Cup has been presented to the winners of the annual Down Senior Hurling Championship ever since.

He died in a Dublin nursing home in 1932, following a series of heart attacks, and was buried in Glasnevin Cemetery.

References

External links
The Letters of Arnold Stephenson Rowntree to Mary Katherine Rowntree by Arnold Stephenson Rowntree, Ian Packer, Royal Historical Society (Great Britain), Camden Society (Great Britain), p. 29.

1870 births
1932 deaths
Irish barristers
Irish Parliamentary Party MPs
Labour Party (UK) parliamentary candidates
Nationalist Party (Ireland) politicians
Members of the Parliament of the United Kingdom for County Down constituencies (1801–1922)
UK MPs 1900–1906
UK MPs 1906–1910
UK MPs 1910
UK MPs 1910–1918
UK MPs 1918–1922
People from County Down
Alumni of the Royal University of Ireland
People educated at St Malachy's College